Sarah Humphreys may refer to:
Sarah C. Humphreys, classical scholar
Sarah Gibson Humphreys (1830–1907), author and suffragist